Osiek may refer to:

Osiek, Świętokrzyskie Voivodeship, a town in south-central Poland
Osiek, Oświęcim County in Lesser Poland Voivodeship (south Poland)
Osiek, Lubin County in Lower Silesian Voivodeship (south-west Poland)
Osiek, Oława County in Lower Silesian Voivodeship (south-west Poland)
Osiek, Środa Śląska County in Lower Silesian Voivodeship (south-west Poland)
Osiek, Trzebnica County in Lower Silesian Voivodeship (south-west Poland)
Osiek, Brodnica County in Kuyavian-Pomeranian Voivodeship (north-central Poland)
Osiek, Gmina Koronowo in Kuyavian-Pomeranian Voivodeship (north-central Poland)
Osiek, Toruń County in Kuyavian-Pomeranian Voivodeship (north-central Poland)
Osiek, Łowicz County in Łódź Voivodeship (central Poland)
Osiek, Wieruszów County in Łódź Voivodeship (central Poland)
Osiek, Olkusz County in Lesser Poland Voivodeship (south Poland)
Osiek, Płock County in Masovian Voivodeship (east-central Poland)
Osiek, Gmina Czerwińsk nad Wisłą in Masovian Voivodeship (east-central Poland)
Osiek, Gmina Joniec in Masovian Voivodeship (east-central Poland)
Osiek, Gmina Mochowo in Masovian Voivodeship (east-central Poland)
Osiek, Gmina Zawidz in Masovian Voivodeship (east-central Poland)
Osiek, Jarocin County in Greater Poland Voivodeship (west-central Poland)
Osiek, Kościan County in Greater Poland Voivodeship (west-central Poland)
Osiek, Ostrów Wielkopolski County in Greater Poland Voivodeship (west-central Poland)
Osiek, Rawicz County in Greater Poland Voivodeship (west-central Poland)
Osiek, Silesian Voivodeship (south Poland)
Osiek, Strzelce-Drezdenko County in Lubusz Voivodeship (west Poland)
Osiek, Żary County in Lubusz Voivodeship (west Poland)
Osiek, Opole Voivodeship (south-west Poland)
Osiek, Starogard County in Pomeranian Voivodeship (north Poland)
Osiek, Wejherowo County in Pomeranian Voivodeship (north Poland)
Osiek, Warmian-Masurian Voivodeship (north Poland)

See also
OSIEK, acronym for Organiza Societo de Internaciaj Esperanto-Konferencoj, a body which annually awards a prize for translation or for original literature in Esperanto
Osiek nad Notecią, a village in Piła County, Greater Poland Voivodeship (west-central Poland)
Osijek, a city in Croatia